Journal of International Economic Law, published by the Oxford University Press, is one of the most highly cited international law journals in the world.  The journal published on topics of international economic law, broadly conceived.  The journal was formerly edited by John H. Jackson. Currently Joost Pauwelyn from the Graduate Institute of International and Development Studies and Chris Brummer from the Georgetown University Law Center are heading the publication. It has published works ranging from former Yale Law School Dean Harold Hongju Koh and Stanford Law School Professor Alan O. Sykes. Indexed in over twenty abstract/indexing services, the journal has been cited in a number of WTO case disputes and other judicial decisions.

References

External links
Oxford Journals, Journal of International Economic Law

Law journals
International law journals
Economic law
Oxford University Press academic journals